The 2018–19 Stanford Cardinal men's basketball team represented Stanford University during the 2018–19 NCAA Division I men's basketball season. The Cardinal, led by third year head coach Jerod Haase, played their home games at Maples Pavilion as a member of the Pac-12 Conference.

Previous season 
The Cardinal finished the 2017-18 season 19-16, 11-7 in Pac-12 play to finish in a three-way tie for third place; this was their most conference wins in a decade (since 2008). They lost in the quarterfinals of the Pac-12 tournament to UCLA. They qualified for the NIT beating BYU in the first round, but lost to Oklahoma State in the second round.

Offseason

Departures

2018 recruiting class

2019 Recruiting class

Roster

Schedule and results

|-
!colspan=12 style=| Exhibition

|-
!colspan=12 style=| Non-conference regular season

|-

|-

|-

|-

|-

|-

|-

|-

|-
!colspan=12 style=| Pac-12 Regular season

|-

|-

|-

|-

|-

|-

|-

|-

|-

|-

|-

|-

|-

|-

|-

|-

|-

|-
!colspan=12 style=| Pac-12 tournament

The game between Stanford and Wofford had been originally scheduled for November 16, 2018, but was cancelled due to wildfires and will not be rescheduled.

References

Stanford Cardinal men's basketball seasons
Stanford
Stanford
Stanford